This is a list of ambassadors of The Republic of Niger to the United States.

The Republic of Niger first established diplomatic relations with the United States upon the African nation's independence in 1960, and the Nigerien Embassy has operated since its formal opening on April 17, 1961.
Relations between the United States and Niger have been continuous since that time, although there have been periods of tension following military coups in 1996 and 1999.

The Embassy of Niger in Washington, D.C. is located in Washington, D.C.
The Ambassador in Washington, D.C. is accredited regularly with the governments in Buenos Aires, Brasilia and Seoul.

Ambassadors 

 Issoufou Saidou-Djermakoye
 Title: Ambassador Extraordinary and Plenipotentiary
 Appointed:March 16, 1961 
 Presented credentials:April 17, 1961
 Abdou Sidikou
 Title: Ambassador Extraordinary and Plenipotentiary
 Appointed:October 26, 1962
 Presented credentials:December 4, 1962
 Ary Tanimoune
 Title: Ambassador Extraordinary and Plenipotentiary
 Appointed:January 8, 1965 
 Presented credentials:January 14, 1965
 Adamou Mayaki
 Title: Ambassador Extraordinary and Plenipotentiary
 Appointed:January 26, 1966 
 Presented credentials:February 1, 1966
 Georges Mahaman Condat
 Title: Ambassador Extraordinary and Plenipotentiary
 Appointed: July 1, 1970
 Presented credentials:July 21, 1970
 Monique Hadiza
 Title: Chargé d'affaires a.i.
 Appointed: January 1, 1972
 Oumarou G. Youssoufou
 Title: Chargé d'affaires a.i.
 Appointed: March 6, 1972
 Abdoulaye Diallo
 Title: Ambassador Extraordinary and Plenipotentiary
 Appointed:September 29, 1972 
 Presented credentials:October 2, 1972
 Moussa Dourfaye
 Title: First Secretary, 
 Appointed:August 9, 1974 
 Ilia Salifou
 Title: Ambassador Extraordinary and Plenipotentiary
 Appointed:September 3, 1974 
 Presented credentials: October 4, 1974
 Andre Joseph Wright
 Title: Ambassador Extraordinary and Plenipotentiary
 Appointed:September 2, 1976 
 Presented credentials:November 18, 1976
 Joseph Diatta
 Title: Ambassador Extraordinary and Plenipotentiary
 Appointed: November 18, 1982
 Presented credentials: November 22, 1982
 Moumouni Adamou Djermakoye
 Title: Ambassador Extraordinary and Plenipotentiary
 Appointed:July 7, 1988 
 Presented credentials: September 19, 1988
 Adamou Seydou
 Title: Ambassador Extraordinary and Plenipotentiary
 Appointed: September 1, 1992
 Presented credentials: November 18, 1992
 Joseph Diatta
 Title: Ambassador Extraordinary and Plenipotentiary
 Appointed: May 12, 1997
 Presented credentials: May 14, 1997
 Hassana Alidou
 Title: Ambassador Extraordinary and Plenipotentiary
 Appointed: ?
 Presented credentials: February 23, 2015
Abdallah Wafy

See also
Diplomatic missions of Nigeria
Niger–United States relations
United States Ambassador to Niger
Foreign relations of Niger

References 

United States Department of State: Diplomatic Representation for Niger. Foreign Embassies in the U.S. and Their Ambassadors. Office of the Chief of Protocol, 2007.

United States

Niger